The 1625 El Salvador earthquake struck El Salvador in 1625. Described as a "violent earthquake that caused serious damage", it affected the city of San Salvador, and left it in ruins. Surrounding pueblos were also affected.

References

1625 earthquakes
Earthquakes in El Salvador
Events in San Salvador